Boeing Field, officially King County International Airport , is a public airport owned and operated by King County, five miles south of downtown Seattle, Washington. The airport is sometimes referred to as KCIA (King County International Airport), but it is not the airport identifier. The airport has scheduled passenger service operated by Kenmore Air, a commuter air carrier, and was being served by JSX with regional jet flights. It is also a hub for UPS Airlines. It is also used by other cargo airlines and general aviation aircraft. The airfield is named for the founder of Boeing, William E. Boeing and was constructed in 1928, serving as the city's primary airport until the opening of Seattle–Tacoma International Airport in 1944. The airport's property is mostly in Seattle just south of Georgetown, with its southern tip extending into Tukwila.

History

Boeing Field was Seattle's main passenger airport from its construction in 1928 until Seattle–Tacoma International Airport (SEA) began operations in the late 1940s, with the exception of its use for military purposes during World War II. The Boeing Company continues to use the field for testing and delivery of its airplanes, and it is still a regional cargo hub. It is used by Air Force One when the President of the United States visits the Seattle area.

The August 1946 OAG lists 24 United Airlines weekday departures, 10 weekly flights on Northwest Airlines and several Pan Am Douglas DC-3s a week to Juneau via Annette Island Airport which was the airfield serving Ketchikan at the time. Northwest moved to SEA in 1947, United moved in 1949, and Pan Am in 1953. West Coast Airlines was operating scheduled passenger Douglas DC-3 service from the airport by November 1946 and served Boeing Field for many years. West Coast successors Air West followed by Hughes Airwest operated scheduled passenger flights including McDonnell Douglas DC-9-30 jet service until 1971 when Hughes Airwest moved its service to Seattle-Tacoma International Airport.  West Coast began operating Douglas DC-9-10 jet service from Boeing Field in 1968.

Boeing Field has one passenger airline, Kenmore Air with daily flights to Friday Harbor and Eastsound/Orcas Island. Before 2019, the last scheduled passenger jets were operated by Hughes Airwest with McDonnell Douglas DC-9-30s in 1971. A proposal by Southwest Airlines in June 2005 was submitted to King County to relocate from Seattle-Tacoma International Airport to Boeing Field, but was rejected by King County Executive Ron Sims in October. A similar proposal by Alaska Airlines (a response to the Southwest proposal) was also rejected. Southwest Airlines said it wanted to avoid the heavy fees at Sea-Tac due to its expansion program.

The transfer of ownership of Boeing Field from King County to the Port of Seattle was proposed in 2007 as part of a land swap with land owned by the Port.

The National Plan of Integrated Airport Systems for 2011–2015 called it a primary commercial service airport. Federal Aviation Administration records say the airport had 34,597 passenger boardings (enplanements) in calendar year 2008, 35,863 in 2009 and 33,656 in 2010.

Facilities
It has two asphalt runways: 14R/32L is 10,007 by 200 feet (3,050 x 61 m) and 14L/32R is 3,709 by 100 feet (1,131 x 30 m). In the year ending January 1, 2019 the airport had 183,268 aircraft operations, average 502 per day: 79% general aviation, 15% air taxi, 6% airline, and <1% military. 384 aircraft were then based at this airport: 229 single-engine, 40 multi-engine, 88 jet, 26 helicopter, and 1 glider. The runway numbers were updated from 13/31 to 14/32 in August 2017, due to shifting magnetic headings.

General Aviation
In addition to tie-down parking areas and hangars for general aviation aircraft, the airport is home for several fixed-base operators (FBOs) including Leading Edge Jet Center, Modern Aviation, and Signature Flight Support. Executive Flight Maintenance and Galvin Flying provides maintenance services. Airlift Northwest operates emergency medical services (EMS) and on-demand helicopter flights.

Boeing Company
The Boeing Company has facilities at the airport. Final preparations for delivery of Boeing 737 aircraft after the first test flight are made at Boeing Field. Boeing facilities at the airport have also included a paint hangar and flight test facilities. The initial assembly of the 737 was at Boeing Field in the 1960s because the factory in Renton was at capacity building the Boeing 707 and Boeing 727. After 271 aircraft, production moved to Renton in late 1970.

Museum of Flight
The Museum of Flight is on the southwest corner of the field. Among the aircraft on display is the first Boeing 747, the third Boeing 787, and an ex-British Airways Concorde, lent to the museum from BA, a supersonic airliner that landed at Boeing Field on its first visit to Seattle on November 15, 1984. Aircraft on the airfield can be seen from the museum.

Police and fire response
The King County International Airport contracts with the King County Sheriff's Office for police services. Deputies assigned to the airport wear a mix of both Police and Fire uniforms, turnouts etc., which includes single Police, Fire/ARFF patch, and drive King County International Airport Police patrol cars. There are currently 17 patrol officers/sergeants and one chief assigned full-time to the airport. Officers assigned to the airport are also required to obtain a Washington State Fire Fighter One certification and an Emergency Medical Technician certification.

Airlines and destinations

Passenger

Cargo

Previous airline service
In 1945, Northwest Airlines was operating all flights from the airport with 21-passenger seat Douglas DC-3s with direct service to such major cities as Minneapolis/St. Paul, MN, Milwaukee, Chicago, Detroit and New York City with these eastbound flights making intermediate stops enroute at smaller cities such as Spokane, Great Falls, Missoula, Helena, Billings and other small cities.  United Airlines was operating Douglas DC-6, Douglas DC-4 and Douglas DC-3 service from Boeing Field in 1947 with direct, no change of plane flights to San Francisco, Los Angeles, Salt Lake City, Denver, Boise, Oakland, Burbank, San Diego, Vancouver, B.C., Chicago, Cleveland, Washington, D.C., Philadelphia and New York City. At this same time in 1947, United was also operating 20 nonstop flights on a daily basis to Portland, OR as well as a daily nonstop DC-6 flight to San Francisco named "The California" which continued on to Los Angeles on a one stop basis with the airline also operating daily direct service from the airport to smaller cities in Washington state, Oregon, California, Idaho, Nebraska and Iowa. In 1950, Pan American World Airways (Pan Am) was operating weekly nonstop Boeing 377 Stratocruiser service from Boeing Field nonstop to Honolulu with this flight continuing on to Manila where connections were offered to Pan Am Douglas DC-4 flights to Hong Kong and Singapore. Pan Am was also operating Douglas DC-4 service from the airport in 1950 nonstop to Fairbanks, AK with direct one stop service to Nome, AK as well as DC-4 nonstop service to Ketchikan, AK (via the Annette Island Airport) with flights continuing on to Juneau, AK followed by Whitehorse, Yukon in Canada and then on to Fairbanks.

In later years, West Coast Airlines operated scheduled passenger flights from Boeing Field to Idaho, Oregon, Washington state, northern California, western Montana, northern Utah, and Calgary in Alberta. The airline's April 1968 timetable lists nonstop service to Aberdeen, WA/Hoquiam, WA, Boise, ID, Olympia, WA, Pasco, WA, Portland, OR, Salt Lake City, UT, Spokane, WA, Tacoma, WA, Wenatchee, WA and Yakima, WA operated with primarily with Fairchild F-27 propjets as well as Douglas DC-3 and Piper Navajo prop aircraft but also with Douglas DC-9-10 jets to Portland, Boise and Salt Lake City .  West Coast, which had its headquarters in the Seattle area and operated all of its flights from Boeing Field, merged with Pacific Air Lines and Bonanza Air Lines to form Air West (later renamed Hughes Airwest following its acquisition by Howard Hughes in 1970) which continued serving Boeing Field until it moved its passenger service to Seattle-Tacoma International Airport (SEA) in 1971.  Before the move to SEA, in January 1971 Hughes Airwest was operating nonstop McDonnell Douglas DC-9-30 jet service from the airport to Portland, Spokane and Pasco as well as direct, no change of plane DC-9-30 service to Boise, Calgary, Salt Lake City, Las Vegas, Twin Falls, Lewiston, Phoenix and Tucson, and was also operating Fairchild F-27 turboprop service from BFI at this time to Astoria, Bend, Ephrata, Hoquiam, Klamath Falls, Lewiston, Olympia, Pasco, Portland, Pullman, Sacramento, Spokane, Tacoma, Walla Walla, Wenatchee and Yakima.

Aeroamerica, an airline based at Boeing Field from 1971 to 1982 which operated Boeing 707 and Boeing 720 jetliners, flew nonstop to Spokane, Washington in 1978. Air Oregon, a commuter airline, operated Swearingen Metro propjets in 1979 nonstop to its hub in Portland, Oregon. Helijet, a helicopter airline based at Vancouver International Airport in British Columbia, operated scheduled Sikorsky S-76 helicopter flights to the Victoria Harbour Heliport in British Columbia with direct one stop service to Helijet's Vancouver Harbour Heliport located in the downtown Vancouver, B.C. area.

JSX began service between Boeing Field and Oakland International Airport on July 1, 2019 using Embraer 135 regional jets. As a result of the COVID-19 pandemic, JSX announced in April 2020 that it would indefinitely cease its flights from Boeing Field.

ICE flights

The U.S. Justice Department filed a lawsuit against King County in 2020 to allow Immigration and Customs Enforcement (ICE) deportation flights to leave from Boeing Field. The county had previously halted the practice, forcing the flights to be redirected to Yakima Air Terminal.

See also
 Washington World War II Army Airfields
 Seattle–Tacoma International Airport

References

External links

 King County International Airport-Boeing Field
 WSDOT Pilot's Guide: Boeing Field/King County International (PDF 71 kb)
 Aerial image as of June 2002 from USGS The National Map
 
 
 

Airports in King County, Washington
Airfields of the United States Army Air Forces Technical Service Command
Airfields of the United States Army Air Forces in Washington (state)
Geography of Seattle
Transportation in Seattle
1928 establishments in Washington (state)
Boeing manufacturing facilities
Airports established in 1928